Morganton is a city in and the county seat of Burke County, North Carolina, United States. The population was 16,918 at the 2010 census.

Morganton is one of the principal cities in the Hickory-Lenoir-Morganton, NC Metropolitan Statistical Area. A site five miles north of Morganton has been identified as the Mississippian culture chiefdom of Joara, occupied from AD 1400 to AD 1600. This was also the site of Fort San Juan, built in 1567 by a Spanish expedition as the first European settlement in the interior of North America, 40 years before the English settlement of Jamestown, Virginia.

History

Joara archeological site
The oldest-known European inland (non-coastal) settlement in the United States of Fort San Juan has been identified at Joara, a former Mississippian culture chiefdom located about five miles north of present-day Morganton. In 1567 a Spanish expedition built the fort there, while seeking to establish an interior route to Mexican silver mines. This was more than 40 years before the English settled Jamestown, Virginia, their first permanent settlement in North America.

The Spanish left a 31-man garrison that occupied the fort for 18 months before being overcome in a Mississippian attack. Five other Spanish forts in the larger interior region were also destroyed about that time. Only one soldier survived. The fort and Indian settlement have been under professional excavation since the early 21st century, with findings published since 2004. Europeans associated with the British colonies did not try to settle this far west for nearly 200 years, organizing Burke County in 1777.

Today Joara is identified as a significant archaeological and historic site near the Watersee River in the Upper Catawba Valley. Construction of its mounds is believed to have been started by the people of the Mississippian culture by AD 1000, and they occupied the site continuously from 1400AD to 1600AD. Based on additional archeological excavations at the "Berry Site" that revealed the remains of a defensive moat constructed in European style, researchers in 2013 concluded that this was the site of Fort San Juan and Joara. Earlier evidence found in the area included "military artifacts and burned remains of Spanish-built huts."

19th century
During the Civil War, the Western North Carolina Railroad stopped just a few miles east of Morganton and a Confederate training camp, named Camp Vance after North Carolina's wartime governor Zebulon Vance (whose wife, Hariette Espy Vance, was from Morganton), which was located just outside of town. Both the railroad and the camp were the targets of a raid across the mountains from Tennessee, by the Union Loyalists of the 3rd North Carolina Mounted Infantry in July 1864. On April 17, 1865 there was a small skirmish fought in Morganton, as part of Stoneman's 1865 raid through North Carolina.

After the Civil War, Morgantonian Tod R. Caldwell, became the only Governor of North Carolina from Morganton, when he took over the office after the impeachment of William Woods Holden in 1871.

Public welfare facilities, such as the North Carolina School for the Deaf: Main Building and Western North Carolina Insane Asylum, were first authorized by the state legislature in the late 19th century.

20th century to present

In the early 20th century, textile mills were developed in the Piedmont as industry left union-dominated areas of the Northeast United States. During the century, however, these industrial jobs gradually moved offshore.

In the late 20th century, Morganton and Burke County, was still largely rural and with big poultry farms, which became locations for industrial-scale poultry processing plants. These jobs attracted many new immigrants to the state from Central America, leading to an increase in the Latino population in the area.

During the 1990s, Guatemalan-born workers in Morganton, worked to organize a union at the Case Farms poultry plant but were ultimately unsuccessful. Labor and factory work have changed in the "Nuevo South", where many Latino immigrants work in low-paid industrial jobs. They are competing with globalization in some industries. At the state level, North Carolina is working to encourage immigrant communities and their contributions.

Synthron plant explosion
On January 31, 2006, an explosion occurred at Synthron Inc., a paint additive chemical manufacturer's plant in Morganton. Workers at Synthron reported hearing a loud hiss minutes before the explosion.

On the day of the explosion, operations appeared normal until after the steam was turned off and the polymer initiating solution was pumped into the reactor. The operator in charge noted that initially the reaction did not proceed as vigorously as expected, but later the solvent evaporated and the condensed solvent flow returning to the reactor appeared within normal range. A few minutes later, the operator heard a loud hissing and saw vapor venting from the reactor manway. The irritating vapor forced him out of the building. Three other employees also left the building because of the vapors. The operator reentered the building wearing a respirator and started emergency cooling water flow to the reactor. The building exploded less than 30 seconds after he exited the second time. The US Chemical Safety Board (CSB) stated that the solvent vapor leaked from the overheated and over-pressurised process reactor, forming a flammable vapour cloud inside the building that ignited.

A total of 14 people were injured in the blast, of whom one man later died. In addition, at least 300 fish died due to chemicals leaking into a creek behind the Synthron plant which leads into the Catawba River.

National Register of Historic Places
Properties recognized for their historic significance date primarily to the late 19th and early 20th centuries, the period of more dense development. They include public facilities, such as the state school for the deaf, numerous private homes and former business facilities, as well as several historic districts. They reflect the development of the area by yeoman farmers, and later cotton planters who had plantations, as well as the development of cotton and textile mills, followed by other industries.

They include the Avery Avenue Historic District, Avery Avenue School, Alphonse Calhoun Avery House, Bellevue, Broughton Hospital Historic District, Burke County Courthouse, Creekside, U. S. B. Dale's Market, Dunavant Cotton Manufacturing Company, Gaither House, Garrou-Morganton Full-Fashioned Hosiery Mills, Gaston Chapel, Hunting Creek Railroad Bridge, Jonesboro Historic District, John Alexander Lackey House, Magnolia Place, Morganton Downtown Historic District, Mountain View, North Carolina School for the Deaf Historic District, North Carolina School for the Deaf: Main Building, North Green Street-Bouchelle Street Historic District, Quaker Meadows, Quaker Meadows Cemetery, Dr. Joseph Bennett Riddle House, South King Street Historic District, Swan Ponds, Tate House, Franklin Pierce Tate House, West Union Street Historic District, Western North Carolina Insane Asylum, and White Street-Valdese Avenue Historic District are listed on the National Register of Historic Places.

Geography
Morganton is located in central Burke County in the Catawba River valley in the foothills of the Appalachian Mountains. Interstate 40 passes through the southern part of the city, leading east  to Hickory and west  to Asheville. U.S. Route 70 passes east–west through the center of the city paralleling I-40, and U.S. Route 64 passes north–south, leading northeast  to Lenoir and southwest  to Rutherfordton.

Climate

Morganton, NC, has a humid subtropical climate (Cfa) and is located in hardiness zone 7b.

Demographics

2020 census

As of the 2020 United States census, there were 17,474 people, 6,181 households, and 3,907 families residing in the city.

2010 census
As of the census of 2010, there were 16,918 people, 7,618 households, and 4,117 families residing in the city. The population density was 953.0 people per square mile (368.0/km2). There were 7,313 housing units at an average density of 402.6 per square mile (155.5/km2). The racial composition of the city was: 75.67% White, 12.76% Black or African American, 11.16% Hispanic or Latino American, 1.99% Asian American, 0.55% Native American, 0.81% Native Hawaiian or Other Pacific Islander, 6.64% some other race, and 1.58% two or more races.

There were 7,618 households, out of which 22.6% had children under the age of 18 living with them, 43.1% were married couples living together, 12.9% had a female householder with no husband present, and 39.7% were non-families. 34.5% of all households were made up of individuals, and 14.4% had someone living alone who was 65 years of age or older. The average household size was 2.31 and the average family size was 2.92.

In the city, the population was spread out, with 21.1% under the age of 18, 8.5% from 18 to 24, 29.3% from 25 to 44, 22.5% from 45 to 64, and 18.2% who were 65 years of age or older. The median age was 39 years. For every 100 females, there were 95.2 males. For every 100 females age 18 and over, there were 92.0 males.

The median income for a household in the city was $29,836, and the median income for a family was $42,687. Males had a median income of $29,118 versus $24,723 for females. The per capita income for the city was $20,906. About 9.7% of families and 13.6% of the population were below the poverty line, including 17.0% of those under age 18 and 11.9% of those age 65 or over.

Economy
The state of North Carolina is a major employer in Morganton. State-operated facilities located in Morganton include Broughton Hospital (a psychiatric hospital), the North Carolina School for the Deaf, and the second campus of the North Carolina School of Science and Mathematics. Other employers include furniture manufacturing facilities and businesses catering to the many tourists who travel through the area on Interstate 40 to nearby attractions in the Blue Ridge Mountains.

Media
Radio

 WCIS / 760 AM / Religious
 WMNC / 1430 AM / Country
 WMNC / 92.1 FM / Country 
 WHGW / 100.3 FM / Religious

Print

 The Morganton News Herald is the daily newspaper (circulation 12,000).

Education

Colleges and universities
 Western Piedmont Community College 
 Foothills Higher Education Center, occupied by Western Piedmont Community College's Division of Continuing Education and serves as a satellite campus for certain courses of study offered by Appalachian State University, Lees-McRae College, Montreat College and Western Carolina University.

Public schools
 Freedom High School
 Robert L. Patton High School
 Table Rock Middle School
 Liberty Middle School
 Walter R. Johnson Middle School
 Glen Alpine Elementary School
 Mull Elementary School
 Hillcrest Elementary School
 Chesterfield Elementary School
 W. A. Young Elementary School
 Burke Alternative School
 College Street Academy
 Salem Elementary School
 Forest Hill Elementary School
 Oak Hill Elementary School
 Burke Middle College
 Mountain View Elementary School
 East Burke High School
 Draughn High School

Private schools
 Morganton Day School
 Silver Creek Adventist School

Charter schools
 New Dimensions Charter School

Specialized STEM schools
 North Carolina School of Science and Mathematics

Special education
 North Carolina School for the Deaf
 North Liberty Middle School

Other institutions
 J. Iverson Riddle Developmental Center

Recreation
15 miles outside of Morganton is Lake James, which is surrounded by the Blue Ridge Mountains. There are also multiple ski areas located approximately an hour from Morganton.

Golf courses
 Quaker Meadows Golf Course (closed)
 Mimosa Hills Golf and Country Club
 Silver Creek Plantation

Theatres
 Mimosa 7, a movie theater operated by Marquee Cinemas
 City of Morganton Municipal Auditorium (CoMMA), a public auditorium that hosts plays, musicals, graduations, and other cultural and public events.

Parks
Catawba Meadows Park is very close to downtown Morganton and has several baseball diamonds, beach volleyball courts, and other facilities.
Martha's Park in downtown Morganton features a splash pad, playground, and picnic area.
Freedom Park, adjacent to Freedom High School in Morganton, is a 30-acre park with multiple sports practice facilities (sand volleyball, football, soccer, baseball/softball), lighted tennis court, picnic shelters with grills, and a one-mile lighted track.

Notable people
 Isaac E. Avery, most remembered for the blood-stained note he wrote to his father before dying at Gettysburg during the American Civil War
 William Waightstill Avery, North Carolina politician and lawyer; brother of Isaac E. Avery
 Etta Baker, guitarist and singer of the Piedmont Blues
 Johnny Bristol, musician and Motown producer
 Tod Robinson Caldwell, governor of North Carolina from 1871 to 1874
 Joe Cheves, professional golfer and member of the North Carolina Sports Hall of Fame
 Warren Daniel, North Carolina State Senator
 Kony Ealy, NFL defensive end
 Robert C. Ervin, North Carolina Superior Court judge
 Sam Ervin, U.S. senator from 1954 to 1974, notable during the Joseph McCarthy hearings and Watergate hearings
 Kerri Gardin, WNBA player
 Alfreda Gerald, vocalist and recording artist
 Leon Johnson, former NFL running back for the New York Jets, Chicago Bears, and San Diego Chargers
 Dwayne Ledford, offensive line coach for the Atlanta Falcons
 Bill Leslie, TV anchor WRAL News, New Age recording artist
 Chad Lawson, classical and jazz pianist
 Billy Joe Patton, amateur golfer and member of the North Carolina Sports Hall of Fame
 Woody Rich, former MLB player for the Boston Red Sox and Boston Braves
 Tommy Giles Rogers Jr., lead singer and keyboardist for the metal band Between the Buried and Me
 Frankie Silver, the first white woman to be capitally executed in North Carolina
 Paige Summers, model
 Isaac M. Taylor, physician and academic; father of musician James Taylor
 Gladys Avery Tillett, political organizer, active in UNESCO and Equal Rights Amendment activism
John E.  Fleming, nationally recognized museum director

References

External links

 City website
 The Morganton News-Herald

Cities in Burke County, North Carolina
County seats in North Carolina
Spanish colonization of the Americas
Native American history of North Carolina
North Carolina populated places on the Catawba River